Ploumoguer is a commune in the Finistère department of Brittany in north-western France.

Population
Inhabitants of Ploumoguer are called in French Ploumoguérois.

Notable people
 Jean Causeur – 1643–1771, butcher who was said to have lived to 131 years of age. Modern scrutiny of his birth records suggest that he was probably born in around 1665, making his age of death around 109 years, still an exceptional age for his time.

See also
Communes of the Finistère department

References

External links

Official website 

Mayors of Finistère Association 

Communes of Finistère